Kim Dong-hee (born October 24, 1985) is South Korean professional Go player.

Biography 
In 2005, he was runner-up for the BC Card Cup.

Runners-up

Promotion record

References

External links
 Hanguk Kiwon profile 

1985 births
Living people
South Korean Go players